Elohim is a Hebrew word for "god" and a name of the god of Israel in the Hebrew Bible.

Elohim may also refer to:
 Elohim (gods), "Sons of El" in Canaanite mythology
 Elohim, a 2017 film from Nathaniel Dorsky's Arboretum Cycle
 Elohim, a species of extraterrestrials that created life on Earth in the UFO religion Raëlism
 the Elohim, a race of godlike beings in the fantasy series The Chronicles of Thomas Covenant by Stephen R. Donaldson

Music

 Elohim (Alpha Blondy album)
 Elohim (Aka Moon album)
 Elohim (Elohim album)

People

 Elohim (musician), an indie pop musician
 Brasheedah Elohim, American-Israeli women's professional basketball player

See also
El (deity)
Elohim City, Oklahoma, a private community in Adair County, Oklahoma
Elhaym Van Houten, a character in Xenogears